Hypotia sinaica is a species of snout moth in the genus Hypotia. It was described by Rebel in 1903, from Sinai, Egypt, from which its species epithet is derived. It is also known from Libya, Algeria, Iran and Mauritania.

References

Moths described in 1903
Hypotiini